The 2016 Simone Biles gymnastics season refers to the competitions that American artistic gymnast Simone Biles will participate in during the 2016 gymnastics season. Biles' 2016 season may start on March 18, 2016, at the City of Jesolo Trophy, or may start as late as June 4, 2016 – at the 2016 U.S. Classic.

Previous season 
The 2015 World Champion, Biles celebrated one of her most successful seasons in 2015. Domestically, she defended her National title and won two additional National titles; a recipient of 7 senior National titles. Similarly, in international competition, she captured the individual all-around, balance beam and floor exercise titles at the 2015 World Artistic Gymnastics Championships, in Glasgow, Scotland.

As a result of her successes, she is the third most successful gymnast at a World Championships of all time, (by total medal count) trailing only Svetlana Khorkina and Gina Gogean but, has won more gold medals than any other gymnast in the history of the World Gymnastics Championships.

Sponsors 

As a result of forfeiting NCAA eligibility, Biles became eligible to take prize money and earn profit from sponsors. Immediately, she signed with sports agency, Octagon. Remaining signed with Octagon, later in 2015, she revealed that she had signed with world renowned sportswear brand, Nike, Inc. Soon after this, in November 2015, she became an endorsed athlete for gymnastics sportswear brand, GK Elite Sportswear.

Results

References 

2016 in gymnastics